Stoney Creek Township is one of thirteen townships in Henry County, Indiana, United States. As of the 2010 census, its population was 817 and it contained 348 housing units.

Stony Creek Township was organized in 1828. It was named for the stream which runs through it.

Geography

Cities and towns
 Blountsville

Adjacent townships
 Perry Township, Delaware County (north)
 Union Township, Randolph County (east)
 Blue River Township (south)
 Prairie Township (west)

Cemeteries
The township contains two cemeteries: Hodson and Rogersville.

Major highways
  U.S. Route 35

Airports and landing strips
 Starkeys Airport

References
 U.S. Board on Geographic Names (GNIS)
 United States Census Bureau cartographic boundary files

External links
 Indiana Township Association
 United Township Association of Indiana

Townships in Henry County, Indiana
Townships in Indiana